Melaleuca concinna is a small shrub in the myrtle family Myrtaceae and is endemic to the south-west of Western Australia. Its species name translates as " neat" or "pretty" and it is distinguished by having many heads of pink flowers in late spring followed by spherical clusters of woody fruits.

Description 

The flowers are arranged in heads, at or near the ends of the branches which continue to grow after flowering. The base of the flowers is surrounded by white bracts. The flowers are surrounded by five bundles of stamens, each bundle containing 3 to 5 pink or purple stamens.

Taxonomy and naming
This species was first formally described in 1852 by the Russian botanist Nikolai Turczaninow in Bulletin de la Société Impériale des Naturalistes de Moscou under the heading Myrtaceae Xerocarpicae in Nova Hollandi. The specific epithet (concinna) is from the Latin concinnus meaning "neat", "pretty", or "elegant".

Distribution and habitat
This melaleuca occurs in the south Stirling Range, Jerramungup and Ravensthorpe districts in the Esperance Plains and Mallee biogeographic regions growing in sandy loam over clay or laterite in mallee scrub or heath and along railway lines.

Conservation status
Melaleuca concinna is listed as "not threatened" by the Government of Western Australia Department of Parks and Wildlife.

Use in horticulture
This species is not often cultivated but has been grown successfully in Adelaide.

References

concinna
Myrtales of Australia
Rosids of Western Australia
Plants described in 1852
Endemic flora of Western Australia
Taxa named by Nikolai Turczaninow